David Astals Barrera (born 13 December 2001) is a Spanish footballer who plays as an attacking midfielder for CE Sabadell FC.

Club career
Born in Bienvenida, Badajoz, Extremadura, Astals moved to Sabadell, Barcelona, Catalonia aged only two months due to a family issue, and joined CE Sabadell FC's youth setup after representing CA Polinyà. He made his senior debut with the reserves on 22 December 2019, playing the last 31 minutes in a 0–1 Segona Catalana away loss against CE Sallent.

Astals made his first team debut on 19 September 2020, coming on as a late substitute for Héber Pena in a 1–2 loss at Rayo Vallecano in the Segunda División championship; by doing so, he became the first player born in the 21st century to appear for the club. Three days later, he renewed his contract with the club for a further two seasons.

References

External links

2001 births
Living people
People from Tentudía
Sportspeople from the Province of Badajoz
Footballers from Extremadura
Spanish footballers
Association football midfielders
Segunda División players
Primera Federación players
Segunda División B players
Divisiones Regionales de Fútbol players
CE Sabadell FC footballers
AE Prat players